"The Life of Riley" is a song by British band The Lightning Seeds. It was released in 1992 from the album Sense.

The song was a minor hit when it was first released on 2 March 1992, reaching number 28 on the UK Singles Chart. However the song later gained popularity when the BBC football programme, Match of the Day, began to use it frequently for segments including "Goal of the Month", throughout most of the 1990s. The song was still associated with the programme many years later and featured in a similar "Goal of the Day" segment in the mid-2000s. It is still occasionally used for the same section as of 2022.

Background
The writer of the song, Ian Broudie, cites his son Riley as the namesake of the piece. The song title has also been used for a compilation album, Life of Riley: The Lightning Seeds Collection. A remix of "The Life of Riley" appeared on the single "Sense", and an instrumental version appeared on "Change". The single was also later reissued. The song may bear the influence of another, more raucous, song of the same name, "The Life Of Riley", written by bassist Andy Brice and released on Virgin Records in 1979 (VS 283)

Track listing 
 "The Life of Riley"
 "Something in the Air"
 "Marooned"

Charts

References 

The Lightning Seeds songs
1992 singles
1992 songs
Songs written by Ian Broudie
Song recordings produced by Ian Broudie
Virgin Records singles